Sing Your Way Home is a 1945 musical film directed by Anthony Mann and featuring Jack Haley and Marcy McGuire.

Cast
 Jack Haley as Steve Kimball
 Marcy McGuire as Bridget Forrester
 Glen Vernon as Jimmy McCue
 Anne Jeffreys as Kay Lawrence
 Donna Lee as Terry
 Emory Parnell as Ship's Captain

Accolades
Nominated
 Academy Awards: Best Music, Original Song - Allie Wrubel (music) and Herb Magidson (lyrics) - For the song "I'll Buy That Dream"; 1946.

References

External links
 
 

1945 films
1945 musical films
American musical films
American black-and-white films
1940s English-language films
Films scored by Roy Webb
Films directed by Anthony Mann
RKO Pictures films
1940s American films